Winkowski is a Polish surname. Notable people with the surname include:

Mary Ann Winkowski, American television personality 
Thomas S. Winkowski (born 1954), American government official

See also
Wilkowski
Witkowski

Polish-language surnames